Escape from Madagascar is a suspended family roller coaster at Dreamworld on the Gold Coast, Queensland, Australia.

History
Escape from Madagascar opened on 26 December 2002 as Rugrats Runaway Reptar. It was part of the new Nickelodeon Central themed area. The roller coaster was the third of its type in the world and the first in the Southern Hemisphere. Towards the middle of 2011, Nickelodeon Central started to be rethemed into Kid's World. The change saw Rugrats Runaway Reptar renamed and rethemed into Sky Rocket. The ride remains to be Dreamworld's only children's roller coaster. In 2012, the Kid's World area was rethemed to become DreamWorks Experience. The ride was renamed Escape from Madagascar to fit the Madagascar Madness subsection it is located in.

Ride
The ride has one train, which has 10 cars with 2 seats on each car catering 650 riders per hour. The safety system consists of over-the-shoulder restraints that lock into place and then a belt-type connector that attaches the seat base to the over-the-shoulder restraints. Riders are taken up  by a wheeled lift hill, and go through a tight helix, followed by a series of small turns and drops. Upon approaching the station, the ride is slowed by a magnetic brake run. Each ride cycle takes 1.5 minutes.

References

External links
 

Roller coasters introduced in 2002
Roller coasters in Australia
Roller coasters operated by Ardent Leisure
Inverted roller coasters
DreamWorks Animation in amusement parks
Dreamworld (Australia)
2002 establishments in Australia